Long Island is a city in Phillips County, Kansas, United States.  As of the 2020 census, the population of the city was 137.

History
The first post office was established at Long Island in May 1872. Long Island was laid out in 1873.

Geography
Long Island is located at  (39.947283, -99.534673).

Demographics

2010 census
As of the census of 2010, there were 134 people, 60 households, and 38 families residing in the city. The racial makeup of the city was 96.3% White and 3.7% from other races. Hispanic or Latino of any race were 3.7% of the population.

There were 60 households, of which 20.0% had children under the age of 18 living with them, 55.0% were married couples living together, 8.3% had a male householder with no wife present, and 36.7% were non-families. 35.0% of all households were made up of individuals, and 15% had someone living alone who was 65 years of age or older. The average household size was 2.23 and the average family size was 2.89.

The median age in the city was 49.3 years. 20.9% of residents were under the age of 18; 7.5% were between the ages of 18 and 24; 14.9% were from 25 to 44; 35.1% were from 45 to 64; and 21.6% were 65 years of age or older. The gender makeup of the city was 54.5% male and 45.5% female.

2000 census
As of the census of 2000, there were 155 people, 67 households, and 45 families residing in the city. The racial makeup of the city was 97.42% White and 2.58% African American. Hispanic or Latino of any race were 0.65% of the population.

There were 67 households, out of which 25.4% had children under the age of 18 living with them, 62.7% were married couples living together, 1.5% had a female householder with no husband present, and 32.8% were non-families. 31.3% of all households were made up of individuals, and 14.9% had someone living alone who was 65 years of age or older. The average household size was 2.31 and the average family size was 2.91.

In the city, the population was spread out, with 23.2% under the age of 18, 9.7% from 18 to 24, 23.9% from 25 to 44, 23.2% from 45 to 64, and 20.0% who were 65 years of age or older. The median age was 40 years. For every 100 females, there were 109.5 males. For every 100 females age 18 and over, there were 105.2 males.

The median income for a household in the city was $29,250, and the median income for a family was $32,321. Males had a median income of $27,083 versus $17,813 for females. The per capita income for the city was $14,722. None of the families and 5.9% of the population were living below the poverty line.

Education
Long Island is served by Northern Valley USD 212 public school district. The Northern Valley High School mascot is Huskies.

Grades K-4 and 9-12 are located in the Almena school building, and grades 5-8 are in the Long Island school building.

The Northern Valley Huskies won the following Kansas State Championships:
 8-Man DI Football - 1986, 1990
 8-Man DII Football - 1987
 1A Boys Basketball - 1986, 1990, 1991
 1A DII Basketball - 2018
 1A Boys Track & Field - 1986, 1987, 2019
 1A Volleyball - 1993
 1A DII Volleyball - 2017
 1A Girls Basketball - 1994
 1A Forensics - 2003

Long Island schools were closed through school consolidation with Almena schools. The first school year and sports season of the Huskies was 1967-1968. The Long Island High School mascot was Long Island Leopards with team colors of Purple and Gold. 
The Almena High School mascot was Almena Coyotes with team colors of Orange and Black.

References

Further reading

External links
 Long Island - Directory of Public Officials
 USD 212, local school district
 Long Island city map, KDOT

Cities in Kansas
Cities in Phillips County, Kansas